Sebastiaan (Bas) Haring (born 23 April 1968 in De Bilt) is a Dutch writer of popular science and children's literature, television presenter and professor. He is a full professor at Leiden University, where he has held a chair in "public understanding of science" since 2007. He also hosted his own philosophical TV program for Dutch public broadcasting.

Haring first achieved prominence with his 2001 children's book Cheese and the Theory of Evolution in which he explained evolution and its implications. The book received several awards and has been translated into ten different languages. His book For a Successful Life was published in 2008 by Beautiful Books Limited (UK).

Bibliography 
 Cheese and the Theory of Evolution (2001)
 The Iron Will (2003)
 Media technology (2007)
 For a Successful Life: A Plea for the Unsuccessful Life (2008) (Beautiful Books Limited) 
 The Aquarium of Walter Huijsmans (2009) 
 Why? (2009) 
 Falling Quarters-A smart selection of readable science (Along with Ionica Smeets, 2010) 
 The Consciousness (2010) 
 Plastic pandas (2011)
 Waarom cola duurder is dan melk (2016)

References

External links 
 Official page (Dutch)
 Dutch television archives (Dutch)

1968 births
Living people
20th-century Dutch philosophers
21st-century Dutch philosophers
Dutch children's writers
Dutch television presenters
Academic staff of Leiden University
People from De Bilt